Los Angeles National Bank was an overseas Chinese bank in the United States.  Headquartered in Buena Park, California, with branch offices in Silver Lake, Los Angeles and Monterey Park, this privately held community bank was first established on December 18, 1973.

In contrast to other traditional overseas Chinese bank in the United States of its era that primarily served the local disadvantaged ethnic populace, the Los Angeles National Bank primarily focused on small to medium size businesses of one to thirty million dollars in annual sales, and the executive, retail and professional community consisting predominantly of business owners and executives, doctors, attorneys, accountants and dentists.

The bank also has similarity with other traditional overseas Chinese bank in the United States of its era in that it concentrated on serving the local Chinese communities, but its clients were rather upper middle class in comparison to its counterparts, and while it did not have as many offices as its counterparts in California, it did have a representative offices in Flushing, Queens for its rather a unique way of expansion.

In May 2013, the bank was acquired by Royal Business Bank for an undisclosed amount.

References

External links
 Los Angeles National Bank homepage

Buena Park, California
Companies based in Orange County, California
Banks established in 1973
Banks based in California
Chinese American banks
Defunct banks of the United States
Chinese-American culture in California
Privately held companies based in California
1973 establishments in California
2013 mergers and acquisitions
Banks disestablished in 2013